Dang Airport , also known as Tarigaun Airport, is a domestic airport located in Tulsipur serving Dang District, a district in Lumbini Province in Nepal.

Facilities

Airlines and destinations

Access
The airport is located at Rapti Highway.

References

External links

Airports in Nepal
Buildings and structures in Dang District, Nepal